Classica is the third studio album by Italian heavy metal band Novembre.

Track listing

 Cold Blue Steel – (5:23)
 Tales from a Winter to Come – (5:37)
 Nostalgiaplatz – (4:29)
 My Starving Bambina – (4:48)
 Love Story – (4:29)
 L'Epoque Noire (March The 7th 12973 A.D.) – (4:42)
 Onirica East – (6:27)
 Foto Blu Infinito – (4:16)
 Winter 1941 – (6:35)
 Outro – Spirit of the Forest (Tales...Reprise) – (2:57)

References

1999 albums
Novembre albums